Peter D. Clark (born January 27, 1938 in Windsor, Ontario) was Regional Chair of Ottawa-Carleton from 1991 to 1997.

He received a BComm degree from the University of Windsor in 1964 and an MBA from the University of Michigan in 1974. He was mayor of Cumberland Township, Ontario from 1980 to 1989. Clark was defeated by Bob Chiarelli in an election for the position of Regional Chair in 1997. He was appointed director of the Standards Council of Canada in April 1999 and was re-appointed in 2005.

He was voted into council for Ottawa City Council in the Rideau-Rockcliffe Ward at the 2010 municipal election.

In January 2011 he expressed his belief that safety for pedestrians and cyclists is a priority in the city. He supports the bridge to be built over the Rideau river (in his ward), and said this will create a connection to the Laurier Bike Lane to be built if the draft budget was approved. Earlier he indicated Ottawa has to become a city with 21st-century transportation. He also supported the green bin introduction, despite his reputation for fiscal conservatism.

See also

 Mauril Bélanger - former Chief of Staff for Clark as Regional Chair and later Ottawa MP

References

External links
Announcement in April 1999
 Biography

Mayors and reeves of Cumberland
Chairs of the Regional Municipality of Ottawa-Carleton
1938 births
Living people
Ottawa city councillors
Ross School of Business alumni